Boloria caucasica is a  butterfly found in the  East Palearctic (Caucasus , Transcaucasia,  Turkey) that belongs to the browns family.

See also
List of butterflies of Russia

References

External links
Russian insects

Boloria
Butterflies described in 1852
Butterflies of Asia
Taxa named by Julius Lederer